Athanas sydneyensis is a species of small alpheid shrimp.

Athanas sydneyensis belongs to the genus Athanas of the snapping shrimp family Alpheidae. It was first described in 2007 by  Arthur Anker and Shane Ahyong.

It has been found only midstream of the Hawkesbury River in the muddy-sand substrate at a depth of 10 metres.

References

Alpheidae
Crustaceans of Australia
Crustaceans described in 2007
Taxa named by Shane T. Ahyong